Spring of Life may refer to:

 Spring of Life (song)
 Spring of Life (1957 film)
 Spring of Life (2000 film)
 Lebensborn, literally "Fount of Life"